Pankaj Tamuli (28 November 1985 – 13 December 2020) was an Indian cricketer. He was a right-handed batsman and a right-arm medium-pace bowler who played for Assam. He was born in Digboi.

Tamuli, who made his debut in the National Under-22 Tournament in 2001–02, made his only First class appearance in the 2002-03 Ranji Trophy, against Punjab. From the upper-middle order, he scored 23 runs in the first innings in which he batted, and a duck in the second. Tamuli died in Guwahati on 13 December 2020 after suffering from prolonged illness.

External links
Pankaj Tamuli at Cricinfo

1985 births
Indian cricketers
Assam cricketers
2020 deaths